The Don E. Olsson House and Garage is a site on the National Register of Historic Places located in Ronan, Montana. It was added to the Register on January 15, 2009.

It was deemed significant "for its mid-century modern residential architecture that represents an early example of the Ranch style in Ronan and Lake County when it was built in 1950-51". The house, its 1954 addition, and 1952 garage were designed by the architect Thomas Balzhiser (the brother-in-law of the house's owner), and as such the garage and addition share the same design features as the house. The house became a model for subsequent residential construction in Ronan such as the Harald Olsson House at 408 Eisenhower, also designed by Balzhiser.

References

Houses in Lake County, Montana
Houses completed in 1951
Houses completed in 1954
Houses on the National Register of Historic Places in Montana
National Register of Historic Places in Lake County, Montana
1951 establishments in Montana
Ranch house architecture
Modern Movement architecture in the United States